Hualin is a town in southern Heilongjiang, People's Republic of China, bounded to the northwest by the Mudan River and to the east by Linkou County.

Township-level divisions of Heilongjiang